Robbie Crawford may refer to:
Robbie Crawford (footballer, born 1993), Scottish footballer for Monterey Bay F.C.
Robbie Crawford (footballer, born 1994), Scottish footballer for Motherwell

See also
Robert Crawford (disambiguation)